Robin Mann (born 1949) is an Australian Christian singer, songwriter and theologian. His career started in 1969 with Kindekrist. Mann's music is distinctly Australian, and much of it is written to be easily sung by congregations. His music has been published in many Christian music books, including the All Together Now series and Together in Song.

Mann was awarded an honorary Doctor of Divinity by the Australian Lutheran College in 2019.

References

Australian performers of Christian music
Australian Lutherans
Australian gospel singers
Living people
1949 births